"Deep" is a song by Collide, released as a single in 1997 by Re-Constriction Records. It was the only single created to support the band's second studio album Beneath the Skin, which was released in January 1996.

Reception
Black Monday credited the song "Violet's Dance" as exemplary of its album and said "beautiful and catchy melodies are tinged everywhere with noise, and the sample manipulation is extremely nimble." Sonic Boom said "it is highly unusual for a entirely electronic band to unplugged like this but it comes off extremely well" and listed the acoustic version of "Deep" as being the most unique track on the single.

Track listing

Personnel
Adapted from the Deep/Violet's Dance liner notes.

Collide
 Eric Anest (as Statik) – programming, noises
 Karin Johnston (as kaRIN) – vocals

Production and design
 Immaculate – design

Release history

References

External links 
 

1997 singles
1995 songs
Collide (band) albums
Re-Constriction Records singles